Excalibur is the ninth studio album by German heavy metal band Grave Digger, and is the final album of the Middle Ages Trilogy. It tells about the story of King Arthur and the knights of the round table.

Track listing
All lyrics by Chris Boltendahl and Yvonne Thorhauer. Music by Boltendahl and Lulis except where noted.

Lyrical content

 The album is about the King Arthur's mythology. 
 "Pendragon" is about Uther Pendragon, father of Arthur.
 "Excalibur" is about the powerful sword handled by Arthur.
 "The Round Table (Forever)" deals with the principles of the Knights of the Round Table.
 "Morgane Le Fay" is about the witch Morgane.
 "The Spell" is about the enchantment that Nimue used on Merlin to gain his powers, after a promise of sex and love.
 "Tristan's Fate" is about the tragic history of Tristan and Isolde. Tristan here is a knight of the round table. (In some tales, he's not even connected to Arthur)
 "Lancelot" is about the love of Lancelot (Arthur's knight) for Guinevere (Arthur's wife).
 "Mordred's Song" is about the treachery of Mordred.
 "The Final War" is about the last battle of Arthur and Mordred. Arthur ends mortally wounded. 
 "Emerald Eyes" is Arthur's last words to Guinevere.
 "Avalon" is about the fantastic island that Arthur went, where he died.
 "Parcival" is about the knight Parcival and his quest for the Holy Grail.

Credits
Band members
 Chris Boltendahl - vocals
 Uwe Lulis - guitars
 Jens Becker - bass
 Stefan Arnold - drums
 H.P. Katzenburg - keyboards

Additional musicians
 Eric Hecht - bagpipes
 Hansi Kürsch - backing vocals
 Hacky Hackmann - backing vocals
 Piet Sielck - backing vocals
 Bodenski - hurdy-gurdy

Production
 Markus Mayer - cover art
 Jens Rosendahl - photography
 Chris Boltendahl - producer
 Uwe Lulis - producer, mixing, engineering
 Suno Fabitch - mixing, engineering
 Roger Lian - mastering

Grave Digger (band) albums
1999 albums
Concept albums
GUN Records albums